The Countess of Derby usually refers to the wife or widow of an Earl of Derby, such as:
 Margaret Peverell, Countess of Derby (–1154), English noblewoman
 Margaret Clifford, Countess of Derby (1540–1596), great-granddaughter of King Henry VII of England
 Alice Spencer, Countess of Derby (1559–1637), English noblewoman
 Elizabeth de Vere, Countess of Derby (1575–1627), English noblewoman and daughter of Edward de Vere, 17th Earl of Oxford 
 Charlotte Stanley, Countess of Derby (1599–1664), English noblewoman famous for her role against the siege of Lathom House 
 Elizabeth Smith-Stanley, Countess of Derby (1753–1797), English peeress
 Elizabeth Farren, Countess of Derby (–1829), wife of Edward Smith-Stanley, 12th Earl of Derby
 Mary Catherine Stanley, Countess of Derby (1824–1900), English grande dame and political hostess
 Emma Caroline Smith-Stanley, Countess of Derby (died 1876), wife of Edward Smith-Stanley, 14th Earl of Derby
 Alice Stanley, Countess of Derby (1862–1957), wife of Edward Stanley, 17th Earl of Derby
 Caroline Stanley, Countess of Derby (born 1963), wife of Edward Stanley, 19th Earl of Derby